Defending champion Justine Henin-Hardenne defeated Svetlana Kuznetsova in the final, 6–4, 6–4 to win the women's singles tennis title at the 2006 French Open. It was her third French Open title. She won the title without losing a set during the tournament, or without facing a tiebreak in any set.

This was the first French Open main draw appearance for future champion and world No. 2 Li Na, who lost in the third round to Svetlana Kuznetsova.

Seeds

Qualifying

Draw

Finals

Top half

Section 1

Section 2

Section 3

Section 4

Bottom half

Section 5

Section 6

Section 7

Section 8

Championship match statistics

References
2006 French Open – Women's draws and results at the International Tennis Federation

Women's Singles
French Open by year – Women's singles
French Open - Women's Singles
2006 in women's tennis
2006 in French women's sport